Qazi Syed Mohammad Zaman (died c. 1170 AH / 1756 AD) was a judge edicted in accordance with the laws of sharia from Sakras, now in District Mewat, Haryana.

Biography
Mohammad Zaman (died c. 1170 AH / 1756 AD) was declared as the inheritor of his father's profession Qadi-e Shahr (Qadi of the City). He was a rich man. His copies of many judgments as Islamic lawyer were preserved in the Library of Hakim Syed Karam Husain at Tijara. He was expert in medicine and that is why also famous distantly for his treatment in many diseases. He was fond of travelling and excursion.

Family
Mohammad Zaman belonged to the family of Gardēzī Sadaat and was the son of Syed Hayatullah (died 1135 AH / 1722 AD). 

He was married to Bibi Asalat, daughter of Mohammad Kazim ibn Qazi Ghulam Murtaza and maternal granddaughter of Qazi Badruddin (died 6 Ramzan 1169 AH / 1755 AD). 

Badruddin received Farman (royal order) ba-Mohr 'Sadrus Sudoor' Saaduddin by Mughal emperors, Muhammad Shah on 29 Rabi' al-thani Juloos 11, 1141 AH / 1728 AD. The second royal order again from Muhammad Shah was bestowed on him on 17 Dhu al-Hijjah Juloos 24, 1154 AH / 1741 AD ba-Mohr 'Sadr Karimuddin Ali Khan'. 

He had one son Qazi Syed Mohammad Rafi.

See also 
Hakim Syed Karam Husain
Hakim Syed Zillur Rahman
Syed Ziaur Rahman

References 

1756 deaths
People from Ferozepur Jhirka
18th-century Indian people
People from Mewat
Indian Sunni Muslim scholars of Islam
Hanafis
Gardēzī Sadaat
Year of birth unknown